Viszló is a village in Borsod-Abaúj-Zemplén County in northeastern Hungary.

Etymology
The name comes from Slavic personal name Vęceslavъ. 1299 Wyzlou.

Location
Viszló is 70 kilometers northeast of Miskolc, 20 kilometers east by northeast of Szendrő, and 30 kilometers northeast of Edelény.

Neighboring villages
 Tornaszentjakab is to the north
 Rakaca is to the south
 Rakacaszend is to the west
 Debréte is to the northwest

References

Populated places in Borsod-Abaúj-Zemplén County